Razdab (also Romanized as Razdāb and Rezdāb) is a village in Salami Rural District, Salami District, Khaf County, Razavi Khorasan Province, Iran. At the 2006 census, its population was 1,576, in 338 families.

References 

Populated places in Khaf County